Anna Peterson may refer to:

Anna M. Peterson (born 1947), American politician
Anna L. Peterson (born 1963), American scholar of religious studies
Anna Peterson (cricketer) (born 1990), New Zealand cricketer

See also
Anna Petersen (1845–1910), Danish painter
Ann-Sofi Pettersson (born 1932), Swedish gymnast